Valentin Vaala (born Valentin Yakovich Ivanoff, Russian: Валентин Якович Иванов; 13 October 1909 in Helsinki – 21 November 1976 in Helsinki) was a Finnish film director, screenwriter and film editor. His career spanned several decades, from 1929 to 1973, and has been called one of the most significant, in both quality and popularity, in the history of Finnish cinema.

Early career
Valentin Vaala was born to Russian parents Jakov Ivanov (Ivanoff), a milliner, and Nadezhda Aleksandrovna Jeminova. The couple moved from Saint Petersburg to Helsinki prior to Vaala's birth. The family spoke Russian at home, and Valentin attended school at Helsinki's Russian-language Tabunov School. After leaving school, he worked as an illustrator for the daily newspaper Uusi Suomi from 1926 until 1929.

As a teenager, Vaala befriended Theodor Tugai – who later became known as a film director and actor under the name Teuvo Tulio – and the pair recognized their common interest in films. They decided to start making films together, but their first feature-length attempt, Mustat silmät in 1929, never received wide distribution. Vaala himself was reportedly so disappointed with the resulting film that he dumped the original camera negatives into the sea. However, later in the same year, Vaala and Tulio partially remade the film as Mustalaishurmaaja for the Fennica-Filmi company. This film became a hit and earned the starring Tulio the nickname "Finland's Valentino". The pair went on to make two other films, Laveata tietä (1931) and Sininen varjo (1933) with Vaala directing and Tulio starring.

While Tulio moved on with his own acting and directing career, Vaala went on to direct his last film for Fennica-Filmi, Helsingin kuuluisin liikemies, in 1934. After the demise of Fennica, Vaala directed one film for Bio-Kuva, Kun isä tahtoo…, also in 1934. The next year Vaala was hired as the second director of the film production company, Suomi-Filmi, following Risto Orko. Vaala remained contracted to the company for the rest of his career.

Career with Suomi-Filmi

During his career, Vaala directed 44 feature-length theatrical films, the second most among Finnish directors, behind only Toivo Särkkä. 38 of those films were made while he was employed by Suomi-Filmi. His first film with the company was the romantic comedy Kaikki rakastavat (1935). It was also the first film that Ansa Ikonen and Tauno Palo starred in together. The film was followed by an urban comedy, Vaimoke in 1936, which starred the same leading pair, and ended up being a popular success and served as the breakthrough film for all involved. The film was an adaptation from a work by Hilja Valtonen, as was the sequel, Mieheke, which Vaala directed in the same year.

Many of Vaala's films were adaptations of popular classics of Finnish literature, by authors such as Mika Waltari, Aleksis Kivi and Maiju Lassila. Vaala also directed several adaptations on works by Frans Eemil Sillanpää, one of which, Ihmiset suviyössä (1948), has been called his best film, and is reported to have been one of the director's personal favorites. Another personal favorite of his, and also a popular success, was Loviisa, Niskavuoren nuori emäntä (1946), an adaptation from a Wuolijoki play.

During Vaala's career, his most popular films reached huge audiences in relation to the size of his home country. One of his most popular films, Juurakon Hulda (1937), was seen in cinemas by approximately a million viewers out of a population of 3.5 million. It was also remade in Hollywood as The Farmer's Daughter. Vaala's other popular films included Niskavuoren naiset in 1938 and his adaptations from Mika Waltari's books Gabriel, tule takaisin (1951) and Omena putoaa… (1952). Nummisuutarit in 1957 and Nuori Mylläri in 1958 were also among the most watched films in Finland during their release years.

Vaala's final feature film was Totuus on armoton in 1963, but his career still continued as a director of short films. His last credited work was a short documentary film about the Finlandia Hall, created at the request of the city of Helsinki.

Personal life
Valentin Vaala was homosexual and he never married.

Awards
Vaala won three Jussi Awards for directing and one for screenwriting. One of the directing awards was given jointly for Dynamiittityttö and Linnaisten vihreä kamari in 1945, the others were for Loviisa, Niskavuoren nuori emäntä (1946) and Omena putoaa (1952). He earned the lone screenwriting award with Ihmiset suviyössä (1946).

Filmography
 Mustat silmät, 1929
 Mustalaishurmaaja, 1929
 Laveata tietä, 1931
 Sininen varjo, 1933
 Helsingin kuuluisin liikemies, 1934
 Kun isä tahtoo…, 1935
 Kaikki rakastavat, 1935
 Vaimoke, 1936
 Mieheke, 1936
 Koskenlaskijan morsian, 1937
 Juurakon Hulda, 1938
 Niskavuoren naiset, 1938
 Sysmäläinen, 1938
 Rikas tyttö, 1939
 Vihreä kulta, 1939
 Jumalan myrsky, 1940
 Antreas ja syntinen Jolanda, 1941
 Morsian yllättää, 1941
 Varaventtiili, 1942
 Keinumorsian, 1943
 Neiti Tuittupää, 1943
 Tositarkoituksella, 1943
 Dynamiittityttö, 1944
 Linnaisten vihreä kamari, 1945
 Vuokrasulhanen, 1945
 Viikon tyttö, 1946
 Loviisa – Niskavuoren nuori emäntä, 1946
 Maaret – tunturien tyttö, 1947
 Ihmiset suviyössä, 1948
 Jossain on railo, 1949
 Sinut minä tahdon, 1949
 Gabriel tule takaisin, 1951
 Kulkurin tyttö, 1952
 Omena putoaa…, 1952
 Huhtikuu tulee, 1953
 Siltalan pehtoori, 1953
 Minäkö isä, 1954
 Minä ja mieheni morsian, 1955
 Yhteinen vaimomme, 1956
 Nummisuutarit, 1957
 Nuori Mylläri, 1958
 Niskavuoren naiset, 1958
 Nuoruus vauhdissa, 1961
 Totuus on armoton, 1963

Notes

References

External links

1909 births
1976 deaths
Finnish people of Russian descent
Finnish film directors
Finnish screenwriters
Finnish film editors
Film people from Helsinki
LGBT film directors
Finnish LGBT screenwriters
Gay screenwriters
20th-century screenwriters
20th-century LGBT people